The 1995 Toronto Argonauts finished in 7th place in the North Division with a 4–14 record and failed to make the playoffs. With the Argonauts sitting at 2-7, GM Bob O'Billovich fired first year head coach Mike Faragalli and took over the team on an interim basis. The team did not show any improvement, and finished down the stretch with an identical 2–7 record. Following the season, O'Billovich was fired.

Offseason

Preseason

 † Canadian Football Hall of Fame Game

Regular season

Standings

Schedule

Awards and honours
Pinball Clemons, 1995 John Candy Memorial Award

1995 CFL All-Stars

References

Toronto Argonauts seasons